Pupping is a municipality in the district of Eferding in the Austrian state of Upper Austria. St. Wolfgang of Regensburg died here in the Chapel of Saint Othmar while on his way to Hungary for a mission.

Geography
Pupping lies in the Hausruckviertel. About 16 percent is forest and 63 percent farmland.

References

Cities and towns in Eferding District